Son of a Son of a Sailor is the eighth studio album by American popular music singer-songwriter Jimmy Buffett.  It was initially released in March 1978 as ABC Dunhill AA-1046 and later re-released on its successor label, MCA.

Chart performance
Son of a Son of a Sailor reached #10 on the Billboard 200 album chart and #6 on the Billboard Top Country Albums chart.  The album was also certified Platinum by the RIAA.

Three singles from the album charted including "Cheeseburger in Paradise" (#32 on the Billboard Hot 100), "Livingston Saturday Night" (#52 Hot 100; #91 on the Billboard Hot Country Singles chart), and "Mañana" (#84 Country).

Songs
Two of the songs on Son of a Son of a Sailor are written by Keith Sykes and the remainder are written by Buffett.  "Cheeseburger in Paradise" from the album appears on all of Buffett's major greatest hits collections and is a perennial concert favorite, one of "The Big 8" songs that he has played at almost every concert and which is the namesake of the Cheeseburger in Paradise restaurant chain.  Buffett had recorded a significantly different version of "Livingston Saturday Night" for the 1975 Rancho Deluxe soundtrack.  The Son of a Son of a Sailor version of the song also appeared on the soundtrack to the 1978 movie FM that featured a cameo appearance by Buffett.

Record World said that "Livingston Saturday Night" is "a piece of his usual down home rock beat and good-time lyrics."  Record World said that "Mañana" shows Buffett's "sly way with a lyric" and that "Like 'Margaritaville', the mood is easy with a touch of Latin."

Track listing

All songs written by Jimmy Buffett, except where noted.
"Son of a Son of a Sailor" – 3:23	
"Fool Button" – 2:47
"The Last Line" (Keith Sykes) – 3:38
"Livingston Saturday Night" – 3:09
"Cheeseburger in Paradise" – 2:51
"Coast of Marseilles" (Keith Sykes) – 5:02
"Cowboy in the Jungle" – 5:06
"Mañana" – 4:00
"African Friend" – 4:21

Personnel
The Coral Reefer Band:
Jimmy Buffett – acoustic guitar, vocals
Mike Utley – keyboards
Kenneth Buttrey – drums, percussion
Greg "Fingers" Taylor – harmonica
Steve Goodman – guitar
Tim Krekel – guitar
Harry Dailey – bass
Norbert Putnam – bass, kalimba
Jay Spell – keyboards
Harvey Thompson – saxophone
Farrell Morris – percussion
Billy Puett – recorder, bass flute
The Sid Sharp Strings – strings
Deborah McColl, Ginger Holladay, Janie Fricke, Larry Lee, Lea Jane Berinati, Penny Nichols – background vocals

Singles
"Cheeseburger in Paradise" b/w "African Friend" (Released on ABC Dunhill 12358 in March 1978)
"Livingston Saturday Night" b/w "Cowboy In The Jungle" (Released on ABC Dunhill 12391 in July 1978)
"Mañana" b/w "Coast of Marseilles" (Released on ABC Dunhill 12428 in November 1978)

Charts

Weekly charts

Year-end charts

Notes

Jimmy Buffett albums
1978 albums
ABC Records albums
Albums produced by Norbert Putnam
Dunhill Records albums